Vitalogic Astrokalb Radunion Nö (UCI code NOE) was a professional women's cycling team, based in Austria, which competed in elite road bicycle racing events such as the UCI Women's Road World Cup in 2014.
Its title sponsors were Niederösterreichische RadUnion (Lower Austrian Cycling Union) and Vitalogic, a supplier of dietary supplements.

National champions
2016
 Slovakia Time Trial, Lucia Valachová
 Austria Road Race, Christina Perchtold

Roster 
Roster in 2016:

References

UCI Women's Teams
Cycling teams established in 2014
Cycling teams based in Austria